The 1984–85 Tulsa Golden Hurricane men's basketball team represented the University of Tulsa as a member of the Missouri Valley Conference during the 1984–85 college basketball season. The Golden Hurricane played their home games at the Tulsa Convention Center. Led by head coach Nolan Richardson, serving in his final season at the school, they finished the season 23–8 overall and 12–4 in conference play to finish tied atop the MVC standings. The Golden Hurricane lost to Wichita State in overtime in the championship game of the MVC tournament, but received an at-large bid to the NCAA tournament as the No. 6 seed in the West region. Tulsa lost to No. 11 seed UTEP in the opening round.

Guard Steve Harris ended his career as the all-time scoring leader (2,272) in program history and first Golden Hurricane player to exceed 2,000 career points. Harris's mark would stand for 12 seasons before Shea Seals finished his career with a total only 16 points greater (2,288).

Roster

Schedule and results

|-
!colspan=9 style=| Regular season

|-
!colspan=9 style=| MVC Tournament

|-
!colspan=9 style=| NCAA Tournament

Rankings

NBA Draft

References

Tulsa Golden Hurricane men's basketball seasons
Tulsa
Tulsa Golden Hurricane men's b
Tulsa Golden Hurricane men's b
Tulsa